Foreign ownership of companies of Canada pertains to the majority-ownership of Canadian-based assets (including businesses and subsidiaries) by non-Canadian individuals or companies, as well as to companies that are effectively owned or controlled, directly or indirectly, by non-Canadians. "Non-Canadian," for all intents and purposes, refers to entities based outside of Canada and to those who are not Canadian citizens or qualified permanent residents.

Foreign ownership (or 'foreign affiliates') of Canadian companies has long been a controversial political issue in Canada. Concerns regarding the issue generally regard ownership of previously 'Canadian' assets by foreign entities, though the exact definition of 'foreign-owned' is subject of debate.

Foreign majority-owned affiliates contribute significantly to the economy of Canada. In 2016, foreign affiliates accounted for 14% of Canada's gross domestic product and employed 12% of workers.

Overview 
Historically, foreign ownership was a political issue in Canada in the late 1960s and early 1970s, when it was believed by some that U.S. investment had reached new heights (though its levels had actually remained stable for decades), and then in the 1980s, during debates over the Free Trade Agreement.

However, the situation has changed, since in the interim period, Canada itself became a major investor and owner of foreign corporations. Since the 1980s, Canada's levels of investment and ownership in foreign companies have been larger than foreign investment and ownership in Canada. In some smaller countries, such as Montenegro, Canadian investment is sizable enough to make up a major portion of the economy. In Northern Ireland, for example, Canada is the largest foreign investor. By becoming foreign owners themselves, Canadians have become far less politically concerned about investment within Canada.

Of note is that Canada's largest companies by value, and largest employers, tend to be foreign-owned in a way that is more typical of a developing nation than a G8 member.  The best example is the automotive sector, one of Canada's most important industries. It is dominated by American, German, and Japanese automotive giants. Although this situation is not unique to Canada in the global context, it is unique among G8 nations, and many other relatively small nations also have national automotive companies.

In 2004, foreign-controlled corporations accounted for 21.9% of assets held in Canada, and 30.0% of operating revenues yet comprised less than 1% (approx. 8,000) of the total 1.3 million corporations in Canada. Assets of foreign-controlled corporations rose 8.3% to $1.1 trillion in 2004, while those of Canadian-controlled corporations rose 8.9% to $3.9 trillion. All in all, foreign-controlled profits soared to a record $68 billion that year, up 21.7% from 2003. Also that year, foreign-controlled corporations operating revenues in Canada averaged $96 million, compared with less than $2 million for their Canadian-controlled counterparts.

In 2006, 34 Canadian companies were purchased by foreign interests worth $62 billion, nearly 4% of Canada's market value.

Statistics 
In 2016, foreign affiliates accounted for 14% of Canada's gross domestic product and employed 12% of workers. That year, foreign affiliates in the manufacturing sector accounted for 41% of the value added of foreign multinationals operating in Canada, an increase from 38% in 2010.

Existing foreign-owned companies in Canada

Banks 

 AMEX Bank of Canada — American Express (US)
 Citibank Canada — Citigroup (US)
 Habib Canadian Bank — Habib Bank AG Zurich (Switzerland)
 HSBC Bank Canada — HSBC (UK)
 ICICI Bank Canada — ICICI Bank (India)
 KEB Hana Bank Canada — Hana Financial Group (South Korea)
 Sumitomo Mitsui Banking Corporation of Canada — Sumitomo Mitsui Banking Corp. (Japan)

Gaming companies

Formerly foreign-owned 
Canadian companies that were once foreign-owned but are currently owned by a Canadian company:
 CCM Hockey — acquired by Reebok in 2004, and now owned by Birch Hill Equity Partners.
Cirque du Soleil — Before being acquired in 2020 by Canada's Capital Catalyst Group, Cirque's three shareholders were U.S.-based TPG Capital, Chinese-based Fosun, and Canadian-based Caisse de depot et placement du Quebec.
FortisBC (formerly BC Gas, a public utility company) — Then known as Terasen Inc., it was sold to American-owned energy giant Kinder Morgan for $6.9 billion. The deal was approved in 2005 by the B.C. Utilities Commission despite 8,000 letters of protest. Terasen was subsequently sold to Newfoundland-based Fortis Inc. in 2007.
Tangerine Bank (formerly ING Bank of Canada) — formed by the purchase of several small Canadian companies by the Dutch ING Group. It has been owned since 2012 by Scotiabank (formally the Bank of Nova Scotia).
Tim Hortons — sold to U.S.-based Wendy's International in 1995, and later to sold to the public as an IPO in 2005. It is now owned by Toronto-based Restaurant Brands International, a Canadian-American fast food holding company.

Former Canadian companies acquired by foreign owners

Existing companies formerly based in Canada
 Bauer, Cooper, and Hespeler, historic hockey-equipment manufacturers, were collectively bought by U.S.-based Nike in 1994.

Rules and regulations

"Non-Canadian," for all intents and purposes, refers to entities based outside of Canada and to individuals who are not Canadian citizens or qualified permanent residents.

A business undertaking is considered to be 'Canadian' if it is Canadian-controlled, which generally mean:

 if one Canadian, or two or more Canadian members of a voting group, owns a majority of the voting interests of an entity, the entity is Canadian-controlled.
 if one non-Canadian, or two or more non-Canadian members of a voting group, owns a majority of the voting interests of an entity, the entity is not Canadian-controlled.

In regards to public companies, which are not controlled through the ownership of voting shares, the corporation is considered to be Canadian-controlled if at least two-thirds of the board of directors is Canadian.

Large foreign direct investments in Canada are governed under the federal Investment Canada Act (ICA). This act is primarily administered by Innovation, Science and Economic Development Canada, though defined "cultural businesses" are administered by the Department of Canadian Heritage.

Foreign corporations often incorporate branches or special-purpose subsidiaries within Canada in order to facilitate business and control their investments. Business profits earned in Canada by such a branch will be subject to regular federal and provincial corporate Income Taxes. An additional Federal Branch Tax is also applied on profits not reinvested in Canada. A tax treaty may provide for a reduced rate or exemption threshold for the Federal Branch Tax.

Various federal and provincial statutes place additional restrictions on foreign ownership in specific industries. Federal acts include:

 Bank Act — provides that no person may own and control more than 10% of the shares of a Schedule I bank.
 Broadcasting Act — bans broadcasting licenses from being issued to non-Canadians or to companies that are effectively owned or controlled, directly or indirectly, by non-Canadians.
 Telecommunications Act — restricts foreign ownership and control to 20% of the voting shares of a telecommunications common carrier.
 Insurance Companies Act — provides that no person may own and control more than 10% of the shares of a Canadian-owned life insurance company. (Manitoba legislation also places restrictions on foreign investment in the insurance industry.)

The New Brunswick Business Corporations Act, the Nova Scotia Companies Act, the Quebec Business Corporations Act, and the British Columbia Business Corporations Act make no stipulations that resident Canadians be directors. New Brunswick provides that Extra Provincial Corporations need only have an "attorney for service" resident in that province.

Unlimited liability corporations can exist in Alberta, British Columbia, or Nova Scotia. This form is particularly convenient where the parties are well-established and in no danger of insolvency. Alberta requires the derisory fee of CA$100 to establish this form. In most other provinces, the legislation is significantly more restrictive.

See also
 Canadian nationalism
 Continentalism
 Foreign Investment Review Agency
 Economic nationalism

References

External links
The Canadian Encyclopedia
CBC News - Mergers and Acquisitions
Statistics Canada Nov 23, 2012

 
Companies of Canada
Canada–United States relations
Economic history of Canada
Foreign direct investment
Foreign relations of Canada
Lists of companies of Canada
Business ownership
Foreign trade of Canada
Investment in Canada